Henry Peter "Red" Bittman (July 22, 1862 – November 8, 1929) was an American second baseman and occasional umpire in Major League Baseball (MLB). He played one season for the Kansas City Cowboys.

Playing career
In , he played in the last four games for the Kansas City Cowboys of the American Association, from October 10 to October 14. He was the seventh person to play second base for the team during that season.
   
Bittman was an excellent fielder, handling 21 chances without an error. At the plate, he went 4-for-14 (.286) with 2 runs batted in and 2 runs scored, and his team went 2-2 against the Cincinnati Red Stockings and Louisville Colonels during his short run as a regular.

Bittman also occasionally served as an umpire, working a total of ten games – six of them behind the plate. His first experience was in Cincinnati for the American Association, five days before he played in his first game for the Cowboys.

Sources

External links
Retrosheet

1862 births
1929 deaths
Major League Baseball second basemen
Major League Baseball umpires
19th-century baseball players
Baseball players from Cincinnati
Kansas City Cowboys players